Mason's theorem may refer to either of the following:

The Mason–Stothers theorem, a mathematical theorem about polynomials
Mason's gain formula, a method for finding the transfer function of a linear signal-flow graph